Bostan District is a district (bakhsh) in Dasht-e Azadegan County, Khuzestan Province, Iran. At the 2006 census, its population was 9,596, in 1,575 families.  The district has one city: Bostan.  The district has two rural districts (dehestan): Bostan Rural District and Saidiyeh Rural District.

References 

Dasht-e Azadegan County
Districts of Khuzestan Province